Rob de Nijs (born 26 December 1942) is a Dutch singer and actor, active since the 1960s.

Biography

1962–1968
De Nijs, backed by The Lords, won a talent-contest in 1962 and released his first single in 1962, "Ritme van de Regen". In 1965 De Nijs split from The Lords because they signed their own record-deal at another label; he embarked on a joint circus-tour with Johnny Lion.

By 1967, De Nijs was a free agent; he performed at small venues and worked as a bartender for a living. His attempts to keep up with the zeitgeist, including "Bye Bye Mrs. Turple", failed; he only made the headlines by marrying his girlfriend Elly in 1968.

1969–1972
In 1969 De Nijs took part in the Dutch heat of the Eurovision Song Contest and through musicals like Sajjuns Fiksjen he landed himself a role in children's TV-series Oebele. This was followed in 1972 by Hamelen in which he played Bertram Bierenbroodspot.

1973–1979
Singer Boudewijn de Groot and songwriter Lennaert Nijgh helped De Nijs relaunch his singing career; in 1973 he was back in the charts with "Jan Klaassen de Trompetter".

The hits continued through 1975-1976, notably "Malle Babbe" and "Zet een Kaars voor Je Raam" (a Dutch translation by Lennaert Nijgh of David McWilliams's "Can I Get There by Candlelight?"). In 1977 De Nijs released Tussen Zomer en Winter, a concept-album chronicling the change from a hot summer's day to a cold winter's night, which starts with the hit song "Het Werd Zomer", a translation from the Peter Maffay song "Und Es War Sommer", and ending with "In De Winter", a translation of the Janis Ian song "In The Winter". The album also features translations of Lou Reed's "Perfect Day" and The Beach Boys' "Disney Girls (1957)".

1980s
In 1980 De Nijs released Met Je Ogen Dicht("With Your Eyes Closed") which included the top 10-hit "Zondag" and became the Netherlands' best-selling album of the year. He met Belinda Meuldijk who gave up her own singing-career (after releasing only one single in 1979) to become his chief-songwriter and his second wife (they married in 1984). The first efforts of their collaboration were collected in 1981 on the album De Regen Voorbij ("Past The Rain").

In 1985 De Nijs had a Christmas #2-hit with the peace-anthem "Alles Wat Ademt" from the album Pur Sang; the English version, "Let Love Be The Answer", was later recorded by US-exile singer Joe Bourne for his Bourne in Holland-album of translated covers. In 1986 De Nijs released an album of covers from the 1950s/1960s-era; it included his version of "Living Doll"shortly after the Comic Relief-remake topped the charts.

In 1987 he celebrated his silver jubilee; he re-recorded "Ritme van de Regen" for a Best Of-album and made a guest-appearance in television-series De Band as himself. He also released an album titled Zilver (Silver) which mostly contained his interpretations of famous Dutch songs.

In 1989 De Nijs released De Reiziger (Travelling Man) featuring the bilingual duet "Ik Hou Alleen Van Jou". At the end of the year he wore his Bertram Bierenbroodspot-outfit again for a reunion with the leading-actors of Hamelen.

1990s
In 1990 Stranger In Your Land was released, his first album of English originals plus translations of "Zonder Jou" ("On My Own"; 1981 duet with Demis Roussos), "Bo" (1983) and "Toerist In Het Paradijs" (1989) which became the title-track. The former ended up as the B-side of the "Girls For Sale"-single. In 1992, De Nijs appeared as a judge during the finale of the :nl:Kinderen voor Kinderen festival, where he also performed the VIP-version of Allemaal kabaal (originally from the 11th edition of Kinderen voor Kinderen) with 2 children's choirs (De Waagzangertjes from Alkmaar and De Blokskes from St. Genesius-Rode, Belgium). In 1996 De Nijs scored his first #1-hit with a remix of "Banger Hart".

2000–present
De Nijs entered the first decade of the 21st century with a knighthood and released albums with translations of Christmas-songs and French chansons (including "This Melody" for which Julien Clerc was flown in to sing the French parts). Meanwhile, he separated from Meuldijk after twenty years; he married for the third time and became a father again. De Nijs was 70 when he welcomed his third son Julius.

In 2010 De Nijs released the back-to-basics-album Eindelijk Vrij (Free At Last) which he recorded in the US. In 2012 he embarked on his 50th anniversary tour.

In 2016 De Nijs was honoured with the Radio 5 Oeuvre Award and a tribute-concert.
 
In 2017 De Nijs released Niet voor het laatst; on this album he collaborated with Meuldijk again and sang a duet with his son Robbert

In September 2019, De Nijs announced his retirement from performing after being diagnosed with Parkinson's disease. A farewell-tour and a new album were scheduled for 2020, but postponed because of the corona pandemic. On March 31, 2020 he appeared on the demissionary talkshow De Wereld Draait Door to perform two new songs.

In 2021, De Nijs played the first of his two remaining farewell-shows in Belgium.; the second was scheduled for 2022.

References

External links 
 
 

1942 births
Living people
Dutch male singers
Dutch pop singers
Dutch male television actors
Male actors from Amsterdam
People with Parkinson's disease
Nationaal Songfestival contestants